Geonemertes pelaensis is a species of terrestrial Nemertea. 
Superficially, Geonemertes pelaensis resembles a land flatworm (family Geoplanidae) and lives in the same habitat, but it has an anterior exertile proboscis, whether flatworms have a pharynx located in their ventral side at midlength of body. The number of eyes this nemertean can have varies between 4 to 8 ocelli. 

It is commonly found on islands in the Indo-Pacific, and has been anthropogenically introduced to Caribbean islands and Florida.  Geonemertes pelaensis is a known predator of gastropoda in the wild, and isopoda, and amphipoda in laboratory settings.

References

 Punnett, R. C. (1907). On an arboricolous nemertean from the Seychelles. Transactions of the Linnean Society of London, Series 2, 12(Pt. 1): 57-62
 Jones, H. D.; E. Sterrer, W. E. (2005). Terrestrial planarians (Platyhelminthes, with three new species) and nemertines of Bermuda. Zootaxa, 1001: 31-58

External links
  Semper, C. (1863). Reisebricht. Zeitschrift für wissenschaftliche Zoologie. Bd.13 pp. 558-570 + Tafel XXXVIII and XXXIX

Prosorhochmidae
Animals described in 1863
Invertebrates of the Indian Ocean
Fauna of the Pacific Ocean